Out for Justice is a 1991 American neo-noir vigilante action thriller film directed by John Flynn and co-produced by and starring Steven Seagal as Gino Felino, a veteran police detective who sets out to avenge his partner Bobby's murder by killing Richie, the trigger-happy, drug-addicted mafioso culprit.

The film was released theatrically on April 12, 1991.

Plot
Gino Felino is an NYPD detective from Dyker Heights, Brooklyn, who has strong ties within his neighborhood. Gino and his partner Bobby Lupo wait to bust up a multimillion-dollar drug deal, but Gino sees a pimp violently assaulting one of his girls and intervenes. Shortly afterward, Richie Madano murders Bobby, shooting him multiple times in broad daylight in front of his wife, Laurie, and his two children.

Richie is a crack addict who grew up with Gino and Bobby. He has become psychotic and homicidal due to rage and drug use, and seems not to care about the consequences of his actions. Richie then kills a woman at random, shooting her in the head at a traffic stop when she abruptly tells him to move his car. He heads off into Brooklyn alongside his goons, who are horrified by what he does, but continue to work alongside him.

Gino knows that Richie is not going to leave the neighborhood. Ronnie Donziger, his captain, gives him the clearance for a manhunt and provides him with a shotgun and an unmarked car. Gino visits his mob connection Frankie and his boss Don Vittorio, and he tells them he will not get out of the way of their own plans to take out Richie, whom they view as a loose cannon. While driving, Gino sees a fellow driver discard something moving from his car. Upon investigating, Gino rescues an abandoned German Shepherd puppy.

Gino starts the hunt for Richie at a bar run by Richie's brother Vinnie Madano. Vinnie and his friends all refuse to provide information, so Gino beats up a number of them. He still does not find out where Richie is, but his concern about getting an attitude problem has been taken care of. Gino attempts to get Richie out of hiding by arresting his sister Pattie and by talking to his estranged, elderly father.

Afterwards, Gino and his wife, Vicky, who are in the middle of a divorce, decide not to get one and reconcile, but they, along with their son, Tony, are attacked by Richie's men when they storm into their apartment. Gino kills them all and saves his wife and son. Richie later comes back to the bar and beats up Vinnie for not killing Gino when the situation was one cop against a bar full of armed men. He also has information leaked to the mob that he is at the bar, then emerges from hiding and ambushes the mob's hitmen in a shoot-out.

After visiting a number of local hangouts and establishments trying to find information, Gino discovers Richie killed Bobby because Bobby was having an affair with two women – Richie's girlfriend, Roxanne Ford, and a waitress named Terry Malloy. When Gino goes to Roxanne's home, he finds she is dead. Gino believes that Richie killed Roxanne before he killed Bobby. Gino goes to Laurie's house and tells the widow what is going on. In Laurie's purse, Gino finds the picture that Richie dropped on Bobby's body after killing him.  Bobby turns out to have been a corrupt cop who had wanted a money-making lifestyle like Richie's, and Laurie knew Bobby was corrupt. Laurie had found a picture of Bobby and Roxanne having sex. She had given Richie the picture out of jealousy, never expecting Richie to kill Bobby for sleeping with Roxanne. Laurie took the picture away from where Richie dropped it on Bobby because she wanted to protect her husband's reputation.

Following a tip from his local snitch Picolino, Gino eventually finds Richie in a house in the old neighborhood having a party. Gino kills or wounds all of Richie's men. Gino then finds Richie and fights him hand-to-hand. After beating Richie senseless, Gino finally kills him by stabbing him in the forehead with a corkscrew. The mobsters arrive soon after, also intent on killing Richie. Gino uses the lead mobster's gun to shoot the already-dead Richie several times, then tells him to return to his boss and take credit for Richie's death.

Gino and his wife adopt the puppy as a family pet, naming him Coraggio (Italian for courage or bravery). While out walking, they encounter the same man who abandoned the puppy earlier, and Gino confronts him.  When the man attacks him, Gino defends himself, knocking the man down.  Gino and his wife laugh as the puppy urinates on the man's head.

Cast

 Steven Seagal as Detective Gino Felino
 William Forsythe as Richie Madano
 Jerry Orbach as Captain Ronnie Donziger
 Jo Champa as Vicky Felino
 Shareen Mitchell as Laurie Lupo
 Sal Richards as Frankie
 Gina Gershon as Pattie Madano
 Jay Acovone as Bobby "Arms"
 Nick Corello as Joey "Dogs"
 Kent McCord as Jack
 Robert LaSardo as Bochi
 John Toles-Bey as King
 Joe Spataro as Detective Bobby Lupo
 Ed Deacy as Detective Deacy
 Thomas F. Duffy as Detective O'Kelly
 Ronald Maccone as Don Vittorio
 Gianni Russo as Sammy
 Anthony DeSando as Vinnie Madano
 Dominic Chianese as Mr. Madano
 Vera Lockwood as Mrs. Madano
 Julianna Margulies as Rica
 George Vallejo as Picolino
 Jerry Clauri as Bennie "The Book"
 Dan Inosanto as "Sticks"
 Joe Lala as Vermeer
 Raymond Cruz as Hector
 John Leguizamo as Boy In Alley
 Carl Ciarfalio as Paulie
 Kane Hodder as Gang Member
 Jorge Gil as Chas "The Chair"
 Shannon Whirry as Terry Malloy
 Julie Strain as Roxanne Ford
 Kelly Jo Minter as Hooker Who King Slaps Around (uncredited)
 Athena Massey as Victim (uncredited)
 Manny Perry as King's Bouncer (uncredited)
 Eek-A-Mouse as King's Chauffeur (uncredited)
 Harold Perrineau as King's Henchman (uncredited)

Production
John Flynn later claimed the original title was The Price of Our Blood, "meaning Mafia blood. That was the title that Steven and I wanted, but Warner Bros. said no. It had to be a three-word title like the other Steven Seagal films (Above the Law, Hard to Kill, and Marked for Death)."

The movie was originally much longer and included more plot and characters. Steven Seagal cut some of William Forsythe's scenes because he felt that Forsythe was upstaging him. Also, Warner Bros. brought in editor Michael Eliot to re-edit the original cut of the movie so that it would be shorter and more profitable at the box office. Eliot did the same job on a few other Warner Bros. movies - Wes Craven's sci-fi horror Deadly Friend (1986) and Mark L. Lester's action movie Showdown in Little Tokyo (1991). Some scenes were deleted, and some others were cut for pacing, so two montage scenes with no dialogue are in the movie. Re-editing also caused some minor continuity mistakes. The theatrical trailer shows two deleted scenes: Richie shooting inside a clothing store from which he took a new shirt (in his first few scenes, he is wearing one shirt, then all of a sudden, he is wearing another shirt for the rest of the movie), and a scene where the police captain tells Gino that body count is going up. Some TV versions of the movie included two deleted scenes: Richie stealing the new shirt from store because his got blood on it (also seen in trailer), and Richie and his guys breaking into the house where Gino's wife is and trying to find her, but leaving when some neighbors show up.

Flynn later recalled:

I really liked working with Bill Forsythe and Jerry Orbach and all those guys in the car who played the killers. But I didn't get along with Steven. He was always about an hour late for work and caused a lot of delays. We shot until October 31, 1990, because an IATSE strike was threatened. (International Alliance of Theatrical Stage Employees, Moving Picture Technicians, Artists and Allied Crafts - Ed.) Warner Bros. told us we had to be on a plane by November 1. So we shot for about a month in Brooklyn. The rest of Out for Justice was shot in and around south Los Angeles. We filmed those scenes on Lacy Street, in a slummy area of old wooden buildings that could pass for Brooklyn.

While on the production set, Seagal possibly claimed that due to his aikido training, he was "immune" to being choked unconscious. At some point. Gene LeBell (who was a stunt coordinator for the movie) heard about the claim and may have given Seagal the opportunity to prove it. He supposedly placed his arms around Seagal's neck, and once Seagal said "go", choked him into unconsciousness, urination and defecation. After refusing to comment for many years, LeBell circumspectly referred to the story in 2012 when questioned on the matter in an interview; some outlets chose to consider this confirmation of the story, despite LeBell refusing to directly comment.

Reception

Box office
Out for Justice debuted at number one for the U.S. box office, the third straight Seagal movie to do so. It eventually grossed $40 million, about a third less than his prior movie, Marked for Death.

Critical response
The movie received generally negative reviews. It was originally rated NC-17 for its brutal and graphic violence. Several cuts were made for the film's release overseas. In the United Kingdom in particular, several of the gruesome action scenes were trimmed for the video release, cutting the duration by 54 seconds. It was later released uncut for DVD.

On Rotten Tomatoes, the film has an approval rating of 23% based on reviews from 22 critics. On Metacritic, the film has a score of 38 out of 100 based on reviews from 12 critics.

Audiences polled by CinemaScore gave the film an average grade of "B+" on an A+ to F scale.

References

External links

Movie Review at The Goddess and the Genius

1991 action thriller films
1991 martial arts films
1990s police films
1990s vigilante films
American films about revenge
American action thriller films
American martial arts films
American neo-noir films
American police detective films
American vigilante films
Films about the American Mafia
Films about the New York City Police Department
Films directed by John Flynn
Films produced by Arnold Kopelson
Films scored by David Michael Frank
Films set in Brooklyn
Warner Bros. films
1990s English-language films
1990s Italian-language films
1990s American films
Films about Italian-American culture